Mathias Matthies (August 7, 1911 – September 30, 2004) was a German art director. He designed the sets for around a hundred films and television programmes. He often collaborated with his wife Ellen Schmidt, including on some Edgar Wallace adaptations made by Rialto Film.

Selected filmography
 Dangerous Guests (1949)
 Derby (1949)
 My Wife's Friends (1949)
 Unknown Sender (1950)
 The Allure of Danger (1950)
 Abundance of Life (1950)
 Dark Eyes (1951)
 The Sinful Border (1951)
 My Wife Is Being Stupid (1952)
 Shooting Stars (1952)
 Wedding in Transit (1953)
 The Bogeyman (1953)
 Men at a Dangerous Age (1954)
 Don't Worry About Your Mother-in-Law (1954)
 Doctor Solm (1955)
 I Was an Ugly Girl (1955)
 My Children and I (1955)
 Father's Day (1955)
 The Old Forester House (1956)
 The First Day of Spring (1956)
 The Girl from the Marsh Croft (1958)
 Crime After School (1959)
 Yes, Women are Dangerous (1960)
 The Forger of London (1961)
 The Green Archer (1961)
 The Inn on the River (1962)
 The Happy Years of the Thorwalds (1962)

References

Bibliography

External links

1911 births
2004 deaths
German art directors
People from Potsdam